Melik Zünnun (d. 1175) was the fifth ruler of Danishmendids.

Life

First reign
Zünnun was declared as successor by his father Melik Mehmed Gazi, however he was derecognized by Yağıbasan. Yağıbasan and his other two brother Ayn el-Devle and Nasreddin Muhammed marched into Kayseri and Zünnun took refuge to Mesud I which was his father-in-law. Mesud wanted to incorporate Danishmends to Sultanate of Rum.

Second reign
After Melik İsmail was killed in a palace revolt, Zünnun was in Syria at the time. With the support of Nuraddin Zengi, he entered Sivas with 3,000 troops. However after death of Nur ad-Din, the troops returned to Syria. Kilijarslan II started to attack the Danishmendids and took Sivas, Niksar and Tokat. 

Zünnun took refuge in Byzantine Empire, and the Sivas branch of Danishmendids collapsed.

References

Turkic rulers
Muslims of the First Crusade
1175 deaths
Year of birth unknown
12th-century rulers in Asia
12th-century Turkic people
Danishmend dynasty